Olympia 77 is an album of songs by Dalida recorded live at the Olympia in Paris and released in 1977.

Track listing
 "Il y a toujours une chanson"
 "Les clefs de l'amour"
 "Le petit bonheur"
 "Tables séparées"
 "Comme si tu étais là"
 "Amoureuse de la vie"
 "Pot-pourri"
 "ll venait d'avoir 18 ans"
 "Je suis malade"
 "J'attendrai"
 "Femme est la nuit"
 "Et tous ces regards"

See also
 List of Dalida songs
 Dalida albums discography
 Dalida singles discography

References
 Dalida Official Website

External links
 Dalida Official Website "Discography" section

Dalida albums
Albums recorded at the Olympia (Paris)
1977 live albums